The Riley-Ford 3.3-litre Special, also known as the John Garden Special, or the Beagle, is a roadster, originally built by British manufacturer Riley in 1929. The original chassis is actually based on a 1929 Riley, but was specially modified by British engineer John Garden in the 1940s to equip the larger engine. Only 4 cars were produced. It was powered by the Ford Model A's  L-head inline-four.

References

1920s cars
Roadsters
Riley vehicles